The Petite rivière du Monument (in English: little rivere of Monument) flows in the municipality of Saint-Théophile, in the Beauce-Sartigan Regional County Municipality, in the administrative region of Chaudière-Appalaches, in Quebec, in Canada.

Toponymy 
The toponym "Petite rivière du Monument" was made official on December 5, 1968 at the Commission de toponymie du Québec.

See also 

 List of rivers of Quebec

Notes and references 

Rivers of Chaudière-Appalaches
Beauce-Sartigan Regional County Municipality